Aleksei Vasilievich  Loktev (30 December 1939 – 17 September 2006) was a Russian and Soviet actor.

Honored Artist of the RSFSR (12 April 1972).

He graduated from the State Institute of Theatrical Art named after Lunacharsky (1962).
After graduating in 1962, he was an actor of the Moscow Pushkin Drama Theatre.
From 1972, was an actor of the Maly Theater.
From 1980 to 1989, an actor of the Russian State Pushkin Academy Drama Theater in Leningrad. 
From 1989 to 2006, an actor of theater Glas.
Head,  theater actor and director Theatre Aleksei Loktev's (TAL).

Biography

Actor 

Aleksei Vasil'evich Loktev was born in Orsk. A few years later, in 1943, his father was transferred to work in Moscow. Here, Alex went to school here started in drama school at the ZiL.

After high school, Aleksei worked for some time as a turner at the plant named Likhachev in Moscow, but the craving for art was stronger. At the age of 17, he first starred in a movie, playing a cameo role in the youth film Leonid Lukov's Different Fortunes. A short time later the young man, having successfully passed the exams, was admitted to the State Institute of Theatrical Art named after Lunacharsky.

While studying at the institute played his first role in a movie, and at once the main for Farewell, Doves.

After graduating from the Institute in 1962, Aleksei became an actor of the Moscow Pushkin Theater. At the same time, he continued to act in films. In 1963, on the screens of the country left a great picture of Georgi Danelia, Walking the Streets of Moscow, which became a symbol of the time. Aleksei played in her Siberian boy Volodya Ermakov, who, while on a business trip in Moscow, brought the manuscript of his novel. Together with Aleksei in the film also stars young Nikita Mikhalkov and Evgeniy Steblov. All of them, as they say in such cases, woke up famous after the film.

Immediately, after the painting Walking the Streets of Moscow, Loktev starred in the military kinopoveti First Snow, the family drama, Our House, military-adventure film Tunnel  (USSR —  Bulgaria), drama In Russia. All films were different as a genre, and on the level. However, none of them brought actor the success which was after the painting Walking the Streets of Moscow. The role and has remained in the biography of the actor's most famous and truly stellar.

The last major role in the movie In Russia (1968) ironically was together with Svetlana Savelova, who shot him in the film Farewell, Pigeons!. Actors invited in the hope to pull the film obviously disastrous. Tape still failed at the box office and became final for them as bright film career began. Subsequently, Loktev more rarely appeared in films, appearing on the screen, usually in small roles. 
The theater career was more successful. In those years, tickets for performances in the theater named after Pushkin was given to the load, but posing with Aleksei Loktev halls were full. Directed by Boris Ravenskikh staged performances under Loktev.

In 1972, the elbows behind Ravenskikh left Moscow theater named after Pushkin and moved to the Little Theatre. Here he worked until 1980. With the death of Boris,  Loktev and could no longer find its director. Moved to St. Petersburg and became an actor drama named after   Pushkin in Leningrad. Aleksei was left alone in a strange city, bringing started drinking.
However, he managed to pull himself together, found the strength   come to God. Visit the temple every day: helping with the service and baptism.
Again in Moscow Loktev returned in 1989, joined the troupe of the Glas Moscow Theater.

In the movie, Loktev in the second half of the 1980s virtually no shot. No, he was still in demand, familiar directors offered him the role, allowed to read the script. But in those years, the country began to change values, and elbow did not find anything interesting for yourself.

Director
In the 1990s Aleksei Loktev first turned to directing. In 1993, he staged I'll Be Back! —  a popular singer Igor Talkov. This was followed by performances of  I Believe!  by Vasily Shukshin and  Fyodor and Anna about the life of Dostoyevsky.

Aleksei Vasilievich organized his own Theatre Aleksei Loktev's (TAL), which was both the head and the director, and actor. Great success with viewers had his musical and poetic performance    Visions on the Hill  (the poet Nikolai Rubtsov), staged at the Alexandrinsky Theatre.

One of his last works the play, The Last Love Dostoevsky, which is based on Fyodor diaries, as well as excerpts from the writer of several novels. Performance (in which Aleksei Vasil'evich starred) a few years with success went on the small stage of the Mayakovsky Theatre.

Personal life
Loktev had four children. His first marriage ended up with divorce during his student years. His second wife died of cancer, leaving Loktev with two young children. His daughter Alexandra is married to a rock musician Konstantin Kinchev from the Alisa band . The band dedicated the song What Then,  from the album  Pulse Guardian Door Labyrinth to Loktev.

Death
He died in a car accident 17 September 2006 in Blagoveshchensk. He was buried at the municipal Volkovo Cemetery in Mytischi, Moscow Oblast.

Awards
 Honored Artist of the RSFSR (1972)
 Laureate of the State Prize of the USSR (1972)   for his role as Pavel Korchagin in the play  The Dramatic Song)

References

External links
 
 The life and death of Aleksei Loktev

1939 births
2006 deaths
People from Orsk
Russian male film actors
Russian male stage actors
Soviet male film actors
Soviet male stage actors
Russian Academy of Theatre Arts alumni
Recipients of the USSR State Prize
Road incident deaths in Russia
Russian theatre directors